Charlie Collins (born Charlene Joyce Bailey, 1988, Sydney) is an Australian singer and songwriter. For her solo debut album, Snowpine (June 2019), she was nominated for the 2019 ARIA Award for Best Country Album.

Biography

1988-2007: Early life and The Baileys
Charlene Joyce Bailey was born in 1988 in Sydney to an Indian family. She then moved to Tamworth and grew up on a nearby farm with her older siblings, Kurt (born 1986) and Crystal (born 1985), who are also musicians. The three siblings formed a group, the Baileys, in Tamworth in 2001 with Collins on lead vocals and guitar, Kurt on drums and Crystal on vocals and mandolin. They were later joined by Daniel Conway on lead guitar and vocals and Lindsay Dallas on bass guitar to provide a sound, which "embraces country, pop, rock and white-eyed soul."

2008-2010: Chasing Bailey
By July 2008 they were renamed, Chasing Bailey, a "five-piece pop rock band." In August of that year the group released their debut album, Long Story Short, through EMI. Collins described their music, "We don't want to pigeonhole ourselves at this point and it's not because we don't like country or don't like pop. We are just being true to ourselves and not changing for anybody else... The album has a bit of everything. It wasn't planned that way, but it just reflects our different influences. We didn't want to change how we write to suit a genre. This is who we are."

2011-2017: Tigertown
From 2011 to 2017 Collins was a member of the Sydney pop band, Tigertown, with her husband, Chris Collins (ex-The View), on lead guitar and his siblings, Elodie on bass guitar and Alexi on keyboards. Collins' siblings Crystal and Kurt were early members. The band released six extended plays, starting with Tigertown in 2011 and ending with Warriors in 2017. According to the staff writer for theMusic.com.au, "Their sound is a gorgeous wash of song and subtlety – quiet and layered... [Chris] Collins specifically avoids words such as 'folk'. One gets the feeling he doesn't want his band (or its members) to become some kind of product."

2018-2020: Snowpine
In July 2018, Collins released her debut solo single, "Wish You Were Here". On 31 May 2019, Collins released her debut solo album, Snowpine. The album was recorded at the Snowpine Lodge in Dalgety. Also appearing on the album were Chris Collins (guitar) and George Georgiadis (drums).

2021-present: Undone
Collins' second studio album, Undone is scheduled for released on 29 April 2022.

Collins also performed as a support act for Conan Gray in November of 2022.

Discography

Albums

Singles

Awards

AIR Awards
The Australian Independent Record Awards (commonly known informally as AIR Awards) is an annual awards night to recognise, promote and celebrate the success of Australia's Independent Music sector.

! 
|-
| AIR Awards of 2020
|Snowpine 
| Best Independent Country Album 
| 
| 
|-

ARIA Music Awards
The ARIA Music Awards are a set of annual ceremonies presented by Australian Recording Industry Association (ARIA), which recognise excellence, innovation, and achievement across all genres of the music of Australia. They commenced in 1987.

! 
|-
| 2019
|Snowpine 
| Best Country Album
| 
|
|-
| 2022
| Undone
| Best Blues and Roots Album
| 
| 
|-

References

1988 births
Australian people of Indian descent
Living people
Singers from New South Wales